The Avro 627 Mailplane was a British biplane developed in 1931 by Avro from the Avro Antelope bomber as a mail plane for use in Canada. Only one was built which ended up being used as a test bed.

Development
The Avro 608 Hawk was a proposed two-seater fighter variant of the Antelope, which was planned to be powered by a Bristol Jupiter radial engine. Although construction of a prototype began, it was incomplete when it was redesigned with a 540 hp (400 kW) Armstrong Siddeley Panther engine as the Avro 622.

Following interest by Canadian Airways, who had a possible requirement for a mail plane, Roy Chadwick again redesigned the incomplete prototype to the Avro 627 Mailplane . This was a single-engine, single-bay biplane, powered by a 525 hp (391 kW) Panther engine and fitted for wheel or float operation. The sole prototype (G-ABJM) was certificated on 2 August 1931, and was shipped to Canada for operational trials. While these trials were successful, the Canadian government cut the subsidy for civil aviation and so Canadian Airways was unable to afford new aircraft, so the mailplane was returned to England.

The Mailplane was converted in 1933 to a high-speed test bed for the Armstrong Siddeley Tiger engine, the revised aircraft being known as the Avro 654.

Operational history
On return from Canada, the Mailplane was entered in the 1932 King's Cup Race, where it recorded the fastest speed of 176 mph (283 km/h), although owing to the handicap system, it came 29th.

After conversion to the Avro 654, the aircraft operational life was short, it being dismantled at Woodford Aerodrome in 1934.

Variants
Avro 608 Hawk Proposed two-seat fighter, powered by 425 hp (317 kW) Bristol Jupiter engine. Prototype incomplete.
Avro 622 Redesigned Avro 608, powered by 540 hp (400 kW) Armstrong Siddeley Panther II engine. Incomplete prototype converted to Avro 627.
Avro 627 Mailplane Single-seat mailplane, powered by 525 hp (391 kW) Armstrong Siddeley Panther IIA engine. One prototype built.
Avro 654 Conversion of Avro 627 as high-speed test bed.

Specifications (Avro 627 Mailplane)

See also

References

1930s British mailplanes
Mailplane
Biplanes
Single-engined tractor aircraft
Aircraft first flown in 1931